Thrincophora impletana is a moth of the  family Tortricidae. It is found in Australia (including the Australian Capital Territory and Tasmania).

The wingspan is about 28 mm.

References

Moths described in 1863
Archipini